Vance Arthur Aloupis Jr. (born August 17, 1983) is a Republican member of the Florida Legislature representing the state's 115th House district, which includes part of Miami-Dade County.

History
A native of Maine, Aloupis moved to Florida in 1992.

Aloupis attended the University of Miami, where he served as the student body president, and later graduated from the University of Miami School of Law. Aloupis began his legal career with Legal Services of Greater Miami. In 2010, he joined the Children's Movement of Florida, a 501(c)(3) non-profit, nonpartisan organization that advocates for high-quality early learning opportunities, access to children's health care, and parent support programs in Florida. Aloupis presently serves as the organization's Chief Executive Officer.

In 2014, Vance was honored by the University of Florida as the Young Floridian of the Year. In 2016, he received the Emerging Leader Award from Florida International University's Center for Leadership.

Florida House of Representatives
Aloupis defeated three opponents in the August 28, 2018 Republican primary, winning 34.1% of the vote. In the November 6, 2018 general election, Aloupis won 50.46% of the vote, defeating Democrat Jeffrey Solomon.

References

Republican Party members of the Florida House of Representatives
Living people
21st-century American politicians
University of Miami alumni
University of Miami School of Law alumni
1983 births